Kim Clijsters and Martina Navratilova were the defending champions, but decided not to compete together this year. Clijsters played alongside Tracy Austin-Holt, but they were eliminated at the round-robin stage.

Navratilova successfully defended the title with Lindsay Davenport, defeating Conchita Martínez and Nathalie Tauziat in the final, 6–3, 6–2.

Draw

Final

Group A
Standings are determined by: 1. number of wins; 2. number of matches; 3. in three-players-ties, percentage of sets won, or of games won; 4. steering-committee decision.

Group B
Standings are determined by: 1. number of wins; 2. number of matches; 3. in three-players-ties, percentage of sets won, or of games won; 4. steering-committee decision.

References
Main Draw

Women's Legends Doubles